Frontline Combat is an anthology war comic book written and edited by Harvey Kurtzman and published  bi-monthly by EC Comics.  The first issue was cover dated July/August, 1951.  It ran for 15 issues over three years, and ended with the January, 1954 issue.  Publication was discontinued following a decline in sales attributed to the end of the Korean War.  The title was a companion to Kurtzman's comic book Two-Fisted Tales.  Both titles depicted the horrors of war realistically and in great detail, exposing what Kurtzman saw as the truth about war without glamorizing or idealizing it.

Artists and writers
Artists who contributed included Kurtzman and EC regulars such as John Severin, Jack Davis, Wally Wood, George Evans and Will Elder. Non-EC regulars who contributed included Alex Toth, Ric Estrada, Joe Kubert and Russ Heath.

Kurtzman wrote the majority of the comic's stories with Jerry DeFuccio contributing one-page text stories and an occasional regular story. The issues included writing contributions from artists Davis, Wood and Evans.

Stories and themes
In addition to contemporary stories about the Korean War and World War II, Two-Fisted Tales and Frontline Combat contained a number of stories taking place in historical settings, including the Civil War, the Revolutionary War and ancient Rome.

A series of special issues dedicated to the Civil War included issues 31 and 35 of Two-Fisted Tales and issue 9 of Frontline Combat. Although originally planned to be seven issues in total, the series was never completed. Other special issues of Frontline Combat included an issue dedicated to Iwo Jima (issue 7) and an issue dedicated to the Air Force (issue 12).

Development
Kurtzman's editing approach to Two Fisted Tales and Frontline Combat was a stark contrast to EC editor Al Feldstein's style.  Whereas Feldstein allowed his artists to draw the story in any manner they desired, Kurtzman developed detailed layouts for each story and required his artists to follow them exactly. Kurtzman's writing tended to have a lot less text in them than Feldstein's, which enabled the two war titles to be hand-lettered rather than machine-lettered like the remainder of EC's titles. Kurtzman was also dedicated to making the stories as historically accurate as possible and, along with assistant DeFuccio, put a lot of research into each story. As a result, where Feldstein took generally about a week to complete each issue he edited, Kurtzman took approximately a month.

Reprints
Frontline Combat has been reprinted several times in the years since its demise. It was fully reprinted in a series of three black-and-white hardbacks by publisher Russ Cochran as part of The Complete EC Library in 1982. Between August 1995 and February 1999, Cochran (in association with Gemstone Publishing) reprinted the full 15 individual issues. This complete run was later rebound, with covers included, in a series of three softcover EC Annuals. In 2008, Cochran and Gemstone began to publish hardcover, re-colored volumes of Frontline Combat as part of the EC Archives series. One volume (of a projected three) was published before Gemstone's financial troubles left the project in limbo.  GC Press LLC, a boutique imprint established by Russ Cochran and Grant Geissman, announced in a press release dated September 1, 2011 that it was continuing the EC Archives series, with the first new releases scheduled for November 2011.

Issue guide

References

Works cited

Goulart, Ron. Great American Comic Books. Publications International, Ltd., 2001. .
Overstreet, Robert M.. Official Overstreet Comic Book Price Guide. House of Collectibles, 2004.

External links
(audio) Golden Age of Comic Books podcast: Frontline Combat
Commentary on Frontline Combat #10

Comics magazines published in the United States
EC Comics publications
War comics
Anti-war comics
1951 comics debuts
1954 comics endings
Magazines established in 1951
Magazines disestablished in 1954
Comics edited by Harvey Kurtzman
Bimonthly magazines published in the United States
Defunct American comics